Kingman Airport may refer to:

 Kingman Airport (Arizona) in Kingman, Arizona, United States (FAA: IGM)
 Kingman Airport (Kansas) in Kingman, Kansas, United States (FAA: 9K8)